This list of general science and technology awards is an index to articles about notable awards for general contributions to science and technology. These awards typically have broad scope, and may apply to many or all areas of science and/or technology. The list is organized by region and country of the sponsoring organization, but awards are not necessarily limited to people from that country.

International

Africa

Americas

Asia

Europe

Oceania

See also
 Lists of awards
 Lists of science and technology awards
 List of years in science

References

Science and technology